Jaime Andrés Bustamante Suárez (born 21 April 1980) is a Colombian born – Venezuelan international footballer who plays as a defender.

Club career
Bustamante has played for Millonarios, Caracas FC and Zamora FC. He signed for Brazilian club São Caetano in June 2012.

International career
He made his international debut for Venezuela in 2010.

References

1980 births
Living people
Venezuelan footballers
Venezuela international footballers
Millonarios F.C. players
Caracas FC players
Zamora FC players
Associação Desportiva São Caetano players
Aragua FC players
Venezuelan expatriate footballers
Expatriate footballers in Brazil
Association football defenders
Venezuelan expatriate sportspeople in Brazil